The Porcellanasteridae are a family of sea stars in the order Paxillosida. These sea stars are found at abyssal depths. The World Asteroidea Database includes these genera in this family:
Abyssaster Madsen, 1961
Benthogenia Fisher, 1911
Damnaster H.E.S. Clark & McKnight, 1994
Eremicaster Fisher, 1905
Hyphalaster Sladen, 1883
Lethmaster Belyaev, 1969
Lysaster Bell, 1909
Porcellanaster Wyville Thomson, 1877
Sidonaster Koehler, 1909
Styracaster Sladen, 1883
Thoracaster Sladen, 1883
Vitjazaster Belyaev, 1969

References

Paxillosida
Echinoderm families